The Regattastrecke Oberschleißheim is a rowing venue situated in Oberschleißheim near München in Germany. It was built for the rowing and canoeing events of the 1972 Summer Olympics, and has since hosted numerous world rowing events. It is in everyday use by a number of rowing and canoeing clubs and has the official description "Leistungszentrum für Rudern und Kanu" (engl. Performance center for rowing and canoe).

History
In 1972 an artificial canoe sprint and rowing venue was created in Oberschleißheim for the Munich Olympic Summer Games. The course is accessible through Munich's public transport and roading network. The stands have a capacity for 9,500 spectators.

Major events

Olympics
1972 Summer Olympics

World Rowing Championships
Two World Rowing Championships have been held at the venue:
1981 World Rowing Championships
2007 World Rowing Championships

World Rowing Cup
World Rowing Cups are regularly held at Oberschleißheim.
1997 Rowing World Cup I
1998 Rowing World Cup I
2000 Rowing World Cup I
2001 Rowing World Cup IV
2002 Rowing World Cup III
2003 Rowing World Cup II
2004 Rowing World Cup II
2005 Rowing World Cup II
2006 Rowing World Cup I
2008 Rowing World Cup I
2009 Rowing World Cup II
2010 Rowing World Cup II
2011 Rowing World Cup I

Panoramic view

See also
Venues of the 1972 Summer Olympics
World Rowing Championships
Zentrale Hochschulsportanlage

References

External links

Official site

Venues of the 1972 Summer Olympics
Olympic canoeing venues
Olympic rowing venues
Munich (district)
Sports venues in Bavaria